The Holy Family Church It is a Catholic Church located in Ramallah, in the West Bank, in the State of Palestine.

Latin rites Catholics settled in Ramallah after the Sisters of St. Joseph and the Rosary Sisters opened a school for girls and a boarding school for boys in the decade of 1860–1870. Forty children become the Latin rite and soon a cure, Pierre Cotta, celebrate Mass in a house in the neighborhood of Hatha. He asks later the Latin Patriarch, Archbishop Valerga building a church, but permission by the civil authorities only reaches forty years later. There are 150 Catholics in 1870, and 242 in 1902. The construction of the present church began in 1913 with the permission of the Ottoman authorities who then ruled the place. A rectory, a convent for the nuns of the Holy Rosary and a school (high school now mixed) are also included.

By 1981, the number of Catholics of Latin rite in Ramallah had risen to 1,100 parishioners.

See also
Catholic Church in Palestine
Holy Family Church, Gaza

References

Roman Catholic churches in the State of Palestine
Churches in Ramallah
Roman Catholic churches completed in 1913
20th-century Roman Catholic church buildings